Leiolepis reevesii, commonly known as Reeves's butterfly lizard, is a species of lizard in the family Agamidae. The species is endemic to south-eastern Asia.

Etymology
The specific name, reevesii, is in honor of English naturalist John Reeves.

Geographic range
L. reevesii is found in China, Malaysia, Vietnam, Cambodia and Thailand.

References

External links
 Flickr photo by Michael Cota, taken in Khao Yai National Park - Thailand
 Flickr photo by Thomas Calame

Leiolepis
Reptiles of Southeast Asia
Reptiles of China
Reptiles of Vietnam
Reptiles of Cambodia
Reptiles of Thailand
Reptiles described in 1831
Taxa named by John Edward Gray